Wellen Park (formerly known as the West Villages) is a planned community located in Sarasota County, Florida, United States. The majority of Wellen Park is located along US 41 and River Road within the city limits of North Port, with some portions of the community extending into unincorporated Sarasota County.

History
The land was part of unincorporated Sarasota County and used for ranching and agriculture in the 1930s, becoming known as Taylor Ranch. The property was sold in 2002 and became Thomas Ranch. Following this annexation, the land was sold to developers, who planned on creating a large-scale master-planned community similar to other communities in Florida such as The Villages, Lakewood Ranch and Babcock Ranch. The developers broke ground in the mid-2000s amid a housing boom, however the Great Recession halted further development until the mid-2010s.

In May 2014, a partnership, including Mattamy Homes and Vanguard Land and other developers, invested about $100 million to purchase approximately  that represented the remainder of the former Berry and Taylor family ranch, rebranding the community as the West Villages. The community was to include several new neighborhoods, and a shopping center. Over the next 6 years, construction boomed with the addition of multiple new neighborhoods, a shopping center, and infrastructure.

In April 2020, the master-planned community was renamed Wellen Park. The community will be geographically organized into Districts, with current districts including the West Villages, Downtown Wellen, and Playmore.

Neighborhoods
Wellen Park includes the following neighborhoods:
 Grand Palm 
 Gran Paradiso
 IslandWalk 
 Oasis 
 The Preserve 
 Renaissance
 Sarasota National
 Tortuga 
 Antigua 
 Avelina
 Gran Place
 Wellen Park Golf & Country Club
 Solstice
 Sunstone
 Wysteria

CoolToday Park

In early 2017, the Atlanta Braves professional baseball team announced the selection of North Port, Florida, as the site of CoolToday Park. Sarasota County has approved its funding earmarking about $22 million in tourist development taxes. The city of North Port will provide $4.7 million and the Florida Sports Foundation is slated to contribute $20 million.

The developer donated the land. The Atlanta Braves are making the upfront capital contribution and annual lease payments. By hosting the stadium, Wellen Park intends future activities, events and opportunities for its residents as well as visitors from throughout the region and the country.

West Villages Improvement District
Much of the planned community is situated within the West Villages Improvement District (WVID), a specialized taxing district whose purpose is to provide infrastructure, including community development systems, facilities, services, projects, and improvements to the District.

The District was established by Florida Legislature on June 17, 2004.

References

External links
 West Villages Improvement District website
 Wellen Park website

Planned communities in Florida
Sarasota County, Florida